Matti Kalervo Kahiluoto (11 March 1931 Helsinki – 24 January 2018) was a Finnish diplomat, a master of political science.

Kahiluoto was Ambassador to Tel Aviv 1975–1981, in Belgrade in 1981– 1984, Head of the Special Representative at the Stockholm Disarmament Conference (OSCE) as title of Ambassador 1984–1986, Head of the Political Department of the Ministry for Foreign Affairs 1986–1988, and then Ambassador in Vienna 1988–1991 and Stockholm 1991–1996, after he retired

References 

1931 births
2018 deaths
Ambassadors of Finland to Yugoslavia
Ambassadors of Finland to Israel
Ambassadors of Finland to Sweden
Diplomats from Helsinki
Permanent Representatives of Finland to the United Nations